Fara is a department or commune of Balé Province in southern Burkina Faso. Its capital is the town of Fara. According to the 2019 census the department has a population of 60,972.

Towns and villages
Towns and villages and populations in the department are as follows:

 Fara	(9 259 inhabitants) (capital)
 Bilatio	(224 inhabitants)
 Bouzourou	(964 inhabitants)
 Daho	(647 inhabitants)
 Dakayes	(718 inhabitants)
 Diansi	(182 inhabitants)
 Fitien	(511 inhabitants)
 Kabourou	(2 674 inhabitants)
 Kapa	(246 inhabitants)
 Karaba	(1 126 inhabitants)
 Konzena	(320 inhabitants)
 Koumbia	(823 inhabitants)
 Laro	(2 819 inhabitants)
 Nabou-nouni	(1 897 inhabitants)
 Nabou-peulh	(712 inhabitants)
 Nanano	(1 870 inhabitants)
 Naouya	(1 343 inhabitants)
 Nasma	(152 inhabitants)
 Nasséné	(791 inhabitants)
 Pomain	(1 469 inhabitants)
 Sadon-bobo	(1 075 inhabitants)
 Tialla	(667 inhabitants)
 Ton	(2 095 inhabitants)
 Toné	(2 536 inhabitants)

References

Departments of Burkina Faso
Balé Province